Graham David Lloyd (born 1 July 1969) is a former English cricketer who played for Lancashire County Cricket Club (1988–2002) and in six One Day Internationals for England between 1996 and 1998. His final List A cricket appearance was for Cumberland County Cricket Club in 2003 against Scotland, a match in which he scored 123 runs.

Lloyd played club cricket for Accrington Cricket Club, the town in which he was born. He is the son of former England coach and batsman David Lloyd, under whom he made all of his appearances for England. When Lloyd Senior came out of retirement at the age of 61 to play again for Accrington in 2008 he batted alongside son Graham with father and son making 15 and 78 respectively in a loss against Haslingden Cricket Club.

Lloyd is now an umpire on the first-class umpires list of the England and Wales Cricket Board.

Personal life
Lloyd married Sharon Miller in 1998. They had 2 sons Joseph and Joshua. Sharon Lloyd died after a five-year battle with a brain tumour in 2011.

References

External links 

1969 births
England One Day International cricketers
English cricketers
Lancashire cricketers
Living people
People from Accrington
Cumberland cricketers
English cricket umpires